The Tumult of Bologna is a historical fiction monologue by Italian writer Dario Fo.

Synopsis
As summarised by Joel Schechter, the story covers the revolt of a large band of Bolognese citizens in 1324. After suffering huge losses in a series of religious wars, angry Bolognese citizens rebel against legates of the Pope and their Provençal guards. The papal delegation is besieged by a people's army that, in lack of other weapons, uses its own excrement. The siege lasts for eleven days, "during which excrement was constantly thrown over the fortress walls". Eventually the Provençal troupes and legates leave the area "under a shower of human ordure."

Translations

An English translation has been made by Ed Emery.

References

Plays set in the 14th century
Fiction set in the 1320s
Bologna
Plays by Dario Fo